This article lists the major power stations located in Anhui province.

Non-renewable

Coal based

Natural gas based

Nuclear

Renewable

Hydroelectric

Pumped-storage

Wind

Solar

References 

Power stations
Anhui